Xihongmen Station is a station on the  of the Beijing Subway.
Due to lack of space, the station is the only station on the Daxing Line to be an elevated station.

Station Layout 
The station has 2 elevated side platforms.

Exits 
There are 3 exits, lettered A, B1, and B2. Exits A and B2 are accessible.

References

External links

Beijing Subway stations in Daxing District
Railway stations in China opened in 2010